List of places in York, Western Australia that are listed on a heritage register, whether it be on the National registers, State Register of Heritage Places, or the Shire of York register. The town site of York was registered as an Historic Town in 1978 on the Register of the National Estate.

References

Heritage places in York, Western Australia
York